Jdaydeh is a village in Zgharta District, in the Northern Governorate of Lebanon. Its population is Maronite Catholic.

Al-Jdayde (Jdeideh Quarter), is a historic Christian neighbourhood in the city of Aleppo.

External links
Ehden Family Tree 

Populated places in the North Governorate
Zgharta District
Maronite Christian communities in Lebanon